Michelangeli is an Italian surname. Notable people with the surname include:

 Arturo Benedetti Michelangeli (1920–1995), Italian classical pianist
 Marcella Michelangeli (born 1943), Italian actress
 Umberto Benedetti Michelangeli (born 1952), Italian conductor

Italian-language surnames